Chrysops flavidus is a species of deer fly in the family Tabanidae. The species is identifiable by its yellow legs.

Distribution
United States.

Subspecies
 Chrysops flavidus celatus Pechuman
 Chrysops flavidus flavidus Wiedemann, 1821
 Chrysops flavidus reicherti Fairchild

References

Tabanidae
Insects described in 1821
Diptera of North America
Taxa named by Christian Rudolph Wilhelm Wiedemann